Woss, also commonly known as Woss Lake after the nearby lake of the same name, is a small village in the Nimpkish Valley, located  southeast of Port McNeill and  north of Campbell River on Highway 19, in northeastern Vancouver Island, British Columbia, Canada. The estimated population of Woss and the Nimpkish Valley is 200. The town of Woss lies about 3 km north of Woss Lake, a long, narrow lake stretching about 10 km in a primarily north-south direction with a maximum width of about one km, the southern portion of which is part of Woss Lake Provincial Park.

Woss is a member municipality of the Regional District of Mount Waddington, which also includes Alert Bay, Port Alice, Port McNeill, Hyde Creek, Coal Harbour, Holberg, Malcolm Island, Quatsino and Port Hardy. Woss has regular telephone service, and acquired cellular phone services in early 2016. Woss had one elementary school for many years, that was closed up after its 2015-2016 school year.

Until the mid 1960s, Woss was accessible only by rail from Beaver Cove on the Englewood Railway. During this time, most of the loggers were housed in bunkhouses heated with wood-fired steam. One of the original steam powered locomotives is currently used as a working tourist attraction. Nearby Woss Lake is the main summer recreational playground for Woss residents and the original community campground at the lake is now Woss Lake Provincial Park.

Tage Wickstrom, the school principal until his death in 1986, built the only 440 dirt oval track and field on the north island at his school in Woss. For many years Woss Lake School hosted all of the track and field competitions for School District #85 which included communities from Woss to Port Hardy. The track and field are now known as the "Tage Wickstrom Track and Field" in honour of the educator who built them.

Geology
Woss is on the dividing line between a pluton of Jurassic granodiorite and a mass of Triassic basalt; mountains to the north are basaltic while ranges to the west, south and east are mostly granitic. Surficial deposits in the community are coarse with abundant gravel and stones.

Climate
According to the Köppen Climate Classification, Woss experiences a temperate (Maritime Climate Cfb), giving the area warm dry summers and mild wet winters. Despite Woss having a temperate climate, summer temperatures often exceed 30 °C (86 °F) on average 15–25 days. This is due to the community's inland location near the thickest region of Vancouver Island. Giving the community its own microclimate. As a result of the community being surrounded by mountain ranges, Adiabatic heating occurs. Winters are relatively short-lived, mild, and wet. The most precipitation occurs in the month of November averaging around 350 millimeters (13 3/4 in). Snowfall usually occurs in late February and early March however, snow on the ground is usually short-lived.

Two full degrees warmer. The coldest occurred in late January 1980, plummeting to nearly -20 °C (-4 °F).

References

Designated places in British Columbia
Populated places in the Regional District of Mount Waddington
Unincorporated settlements in British Columbia